Folashade Omoniyi, also known as Shade Omoniyi (born March 26, 1968), is a businesswoman and the executive chair of the Kwara State Internal Revenue Service. She was previously MD/CEO of FBN Mortgages Limited, a subsidiary of First Bank of Nigeria.

Early life and education
Folashade was born in Kano, Nigeria on March 26, 1968. She attended St Clare's Girls Grammar School in Offa, Nigeria for her secondary education. She has a Bachelor of Engineering (Honours) degree from the University of Ilorin and a Masters in Business Administration (MBA) from the Obafemi Awolowo University, Ile-Ife, in 2001. She also has attended executive education programs at Michigan Ross, London Business School, Stanford Business School and Lagos Business School.

Career
Folashade started her career as an engineer in the IT industry from 1990 to 1997 before she joined African International Bank where she was the Head IT & Systems Administration. In 2001 she joined the First Bank of Nigeria where she started as the Head Networks & Communication Management and then branched out of IT into business development. She rose from Assistant general manager to Deputy general manager spanning several roles from business development to retail marketing, public sector and then branch banking services.

Upon reaching the peak of her banking career she was appointed as the managing director/CEO of First Bank of Nigeria subsidiary FBN Mortgages Limited in 2016 after fifteen years with the bank. She held this position for three years and then left to continue consulting in IT and communications.

On October 1, 2019, she was appointed as the Executive Chairman of the Kwara State Internal Revenue Service by the Governor of Kwara State, AbdulRahman AbdulRasaq in a cabinet with over 50% women.

Folashade is a member of the National Institute of Marketing (NIM) of Nigeria, the Chartered Institute of Taxation of Nigeria, an honorary member of the Chartered Institute of Bankers (HCIB) of Nigeria and is also Cisco Certified Network Professional, Cisco Certified Network Associate and Microsoft Certified Systems Engineer certified.

Personal life
Folashade Omoniyi is married to Biodun Omoniyi with children.

References 

Living people
1968 births
Heads_of_state_agencies_and_parastatals_of_Nigeria
University_of_Ilorin_alumni
Obafemi_Awolowo_University_alumni
Nigerian_women_in_business
Yoruba women in business
Nigerian corporate directors
Women corporate directors
Women chief executives